Harpalus latus is a ground beetle in the subfamily Harpalinae that can be found in Europe, Armenia, Georgia, Kazakhstan, Mongolia, and North Korea.
Found in Ontario Canada

Description
It has forwardly extending cervical grooves which are long too. The species nasal is similar to Harpalus rufipes, but it differs in the number of teeth which are crenellated on the median part. The second segment of antenna have 2 setae while it has none on the first one. Its tergum have 4 and 6 setae which appear in transverse rows. It has 2 teeth in front of retinaculum which are directed inward. It also has 4 large teeth on the first instar egg-bursters. Both antennas and pedipalp are rufous and ferruginous.

Distribution
In Great Britain, it can be found in Bidston Hill and Heswall Heath. In 1901 it was recorded from Valentia island.

Habitat
Its natural habitat is forests, heath sand and gravel-pits.

References

External links
Harpalus latus on Flickr 
Harpalus latus on Pinterest

latus
Beetles of Europe
Beetles of Asia
Beetles described in 1758
Taxa named by Carl Linnaeus